The Grenville Front Tectonic Zone is a geological feature in Eastern Canada that separates the Superior craton from rocks of the Grenville orogeny.

References

Geology of Ontario
Geology of Quebec
Geology of Newfoundland and Labrador